The 1950 season was Dinamo București's second season in Divizia A. Because of the system's switch to spring-autumn, between 1948 and 1949 and 1950 championships, Dinamo participated in the Fall Cup. The team played in the 5th Serie, and they won eight matches, draw one and lose one, at home with CFR București.

Dinamo finished the championship in 8th place with 21 points. Constantin Popescu ranked third in the top scorer with 14 goals scored.

Results

Squad 

Standard team: Petre Ivan – Florian Ambru, Caius Novac – Gheorghe Băcuț, Constantin Marinescu, Angelo Niculescu (Ion Șiclovan) – Nicolae Voinescu (Iuliu Farkaș), Carol Bartha, Titus Ozon, Nicolae Dumitru, Constantin Popescu (Vasile Naciu).

Transfers 

Gheorghe Băcuț (UTA), Constantin Marinescu (Jiul Petroşani), Nicolae Dumitru, Nicolae Voinescu and Constantin "Titi" Popescu were brought from Metalul București, along with the coach Iuliu Baratky. Simionescu was transferred to Locomotiva București, and Farkaș to Partizanul Petroşani.

References 
 www.labtof.ro

1950
Association football clubs 1950 season
1949–50 in Romanian football
1950–51 in Romanian football